Apostol Sokolov (23 October 1917 - 12 June 1987), nicknamed Potso, was a Bulgarian football goalkeeper. On club level, he played for Levski Sofia, Prince Kiril Sofia and Spartak Sofia. Playing 15 times for Bulgaria during the 1940s and 1950s, Sokolov represented them at the 1952 Summer Olympics.

Sokolov was considered one of the Eastern Europe's best goalkeepers during his career. He is regarded as the first goalkeeper who began to leave the goal line like modern keepers and even Lev Yashin said Sokolov was his inspiration. He had good reflexes and sense of positioning but above all he's remembered for his innovative style of play.

His son Georgi Sokolov was one of the most talented Bulgarian footballers who played as a winger or forward for Levski Sofia and Bulgaria.

Career

Club career
Sokolov started his career with FC Bulgaria Sofia. In 1939 he joined Levski Sofia. After six first-team games (three for State Championship and three for Tsar's Cup) Sokolov moved to Spartak Sofia. Then he played for Prince Kiril Sofia, before returned to Levski in 1944.

On 1 June 1947, Sokolov saved a crucial penalty in the Bulgarian Cup final against Botev Plovdiv to help Levski beat 1–0. With Levski he won two Republic Championship titles, one A Group title and three Bulgarian Cups.

International career
Sokolov made his first appearance for the Bulgarian national team on 6 July 1947, at the age of 29, in a 3–2 home loss against Romania for the Balkan Cup. He kept four clean sheets during his time with the national team. Sokolov was included in the Bulgarian squad for 1952 Summer Olympics, and played in a 2–1 loss against Soviet Union on 15 July. The last of his 15 caps came in the 1954 World Cup qualifier against Czechoslovakia on 8 November 1953, which ended 0–0.

Honours

Club
Levski Sofia
 Republic Championship (2): 1946, 1947
 A Group (1): 1948–49
 Bulgarian Cup (3): 1946, 1947, 1949

References

External links
Player Profile at levskisofia.info

1917 births
1987 deaths
Bulgarian footballers
Bulgaria international footballers
Association football goalkeepers
PFC Levski Sofia players
First Professional Football League (Bulgaria) players
Footballers at the 1952 Summer Olympics
Olympic footballers of Bulgaria